Procapra is a genus of Asian gazelles, including three living species:
Mongolian gazelle P. gutturosa
Tibetan gazelle  P. picticaudata
Przewalski's gazelle P. przewalskii

The oldest fossils belonging to the genus Procapra date from the late Pliocene or early Pleistocene of central Asia, when the climate was wetter and milder than now. The genus apparently evolved from animals similar to the Pliocene gazelle Gazella sinensis, and is known to have been hunted by early Neolithic humans at Lake Qinghai in China.

References

 
True antelopes
Taxa named by Brian Houghton Hodgson
Mammal genera